Valeska Grisebach (born 4 January 1968) is a German film director. She was born in Bremen. She is considered part of the Berlin School of filmmaking.

Biography 
Valeska Grisebach studied German literature and philosophy in Berlin, Munich, and Vienna before beginning film studies in Vienna. 

Grisebach's diploma film Mein Stern (Be My Star)  won the International Critics' Award at the Toronto International Film Festival as well as the prize for Best Feature Film at the Turin Film Festival. In 2006, her second film Sehnsucht (Longing) debuted in competition at the Berlin Film Festival. Grisebach's third film Western premiered at the Cannes Film Festival in 2017. Similar to films such as The Hurt Locker and Beau travail, Western is focused on the masculinity of its characters, but from the perspective of a female director.

Valeska Grisebach's sister is the actress Anna Grisebach.

Filmography
Be My Star (2001)
Longing (2006)
Western (2017)

Awards 

 2001: First Steps Award for Be My Star
 2001: Prize for Best Feature Film at the Turin Film Festival for Be My Star
 2001: International Critics’ Award at the Toronto International Film Festival for Be My Star
 2006: Special Jury Award at the Festival Internacional de Cine Independiente in Buenos Aires
 2006: Special Jury Award at the Warsaw International Film Festival for Longing
 2006: Film Prize at the Festival of German Film for Longing
 2017: Film Prize at the Festival of German Film for Western
 2018: German Film Prize in Bronze for Western (Best Feature)

Notes

External links

1968 births
Film directors from Bremen (state)
German women film directors
Living people